Al Nakheel is a suburb of the city of Ras Al Khaimah in the United Arab Emirates.

The Indian Public High School is located in Al Nakheel.

References

Populated places in the Emirate of Ras Al Khaimah